Carrabo Italo Ansell "Bill" Monti (30 June 1914 – 1977) was a rugby union player who represented Australia.

Monti was born in the Richmond River area of New South Wales and attended St Joseph's College, Hunters Hill. He played at lock in club rugby for the University of Queensland Rugby Club. He made his debut for Queensland in 1937. A year later he made his debut for the Wallabies, becoming the 320th player to do so and the eighth from the UQ rugby club. White only played one test, the second Bledisloe Cup match of 1938, where the All Blacks defeated Australia 20 points to 14.

References

1914 births
1977 deaths
Australian rugby union players
University of Queensland Rugby Club players
Australia international rugby union players
Rugby union locks
Date of death missing
People educated at St Joseph's College, Hunters Hill
Rugby union players from New South Wales